Joseph Paul Mather (born July 23, 1982) is an American former professional baseball outfielder and current coach. He is the hitting coach for the Arizona Diamondbacks of Major League Baseball (MLB). He previously was a coach for the Cincinnati Reds. He played in MLB for the St. Louis Cardinals, Atlanta Braves and Chicago Cubs.

Early life
Mather was born on July 23, 1982, in Sandpoint, Idaho. At Mountain Pointe High School in Phoenix, Arizona,ƒ he played basketball and was also an All-State performer in baseball. He also set the school record for the most RBI and home runs in a career. Mather also earned nicknames such as "Joey Bombs", "Jo-Jo" and Joe Cotton Mather, a reference to the 17th century puritan minister.

Professional playing career

Minor leagues
In 38 games with the Memphis Redbirds before his promotion to the St. Louis Cardinals, Mather hit .315 with 12 home runs, 24 RBI, and slugged .671.

St. Louis Cardinals
On May 30, Mather was promoted from Triple-A to the Major league club after outfielder Chris Duncan was optioned to Triple-A . On the same day as his call-up, he was in the starting lineup as the right fielder for the Cardinals. He picked up his first major league hit and RBI in the 7th inning, driving in the game-winning run.

He was the last man cut in April 2009, for the team to get to the 25-man roster before Opening Day (Apr. 6). On April 17, 2010, Mather came in for a stint as pitcher in the 19th and 20th innings against the New York Mets, picking up the loss in the game when the Mets won 2–1 in the 20th.

Atlanta Braves
Mather was claimed by the Atlanta Braves on November 3, 2010. After failing to make the Braves' 2011 Opening Day roster, the organization placed him on outright waivers. He cleared waivers and was sent to Triple-A Gwinnett Braves. On April 28, he had his contract purchased from the minors by the Braves, a move that general manager, Frank Wren, described as a "necessity." He had a career-high four-hit, four-RBI night when the Braves faced the Angels on May 21, 2011. He was designated for assignment on June 19 and was later outrighted to Triple-A, but he instead opted for free agency.

Colorado Rockies
On July 4, 2011, Mather signed with the Colorado Rockies.

Chicago Cubs
Mather signed a minor league contract with the Chicago Cubs on January 4, 2012. With a successful spring, Mather made the Cubs opening day roster.

Philadelphia Phillies
The Philadelphia Phillies signed Mather to a minor league contract but he did not make the team and was released.

Lancaster Barnstormers
He subsequently signed with the Lancaster Barnstormers in the Atlantic League of Professional Baseball.

Cincinnati Reds
On May 6, 2013, the Cincinnati Reds signed Mather to a minor league contract and assigned him to the Double A Pensacola Blue Wahoos.

Bridgeport Bluefish
Mather signed with the Bridgeport Bluefish for the 2014 season.

Coaching career
Mather joined the Arizona Diamondbacks organization in 2015, and served as a coach for the Missoula Osprey in 2015 and 2016. He served as the bench coach for the Jackson Generals in 2017. He served as the manager of the Visalia Rawhide in 2018. He spent the 2019 season as the Diamondbacks minor league field and hitting coordinator.

Mather was hired by the Cincinnati Reds to serve as their assistant hitting coach on December 17, 2019.

On October 28, 2021, the Arizona Diamondbacks hired Mather as their hitting coach for the 2022 season.

Personal life
Mather resides in Phoenix, Arizona, and enjoys playing golf in his free time.

Joe has one daughter, Maddy Mather, now four years old. He is also expecting a second child due in 2022.

References

External links

Mather player profile at Scout.com
http://www.ocregister.com/ocr/sections/sports/sports/article_288564.php
http://www.encyclopedia.com/doc/1G1-79854352.html

    

1982 births
Living people
People from Sandpoint, Idaho
Baseball coaches from Idaho
Baseball players from Idaho
Major League Baseball outfielders
Major League Baseball hitting coaches
St. Louis Cardinals players
Arizona Diamondbacks coaches
Atlanta Braves players
Chicago Cubs players
Cincinnati Reds coaches
Johnson City Cardinals players
New Jersey Cardinals players
Bridgeport Bluefish players
Peoria Chiefs players
Mesa Solar Sox players
Algodoneros de Guasave players
American expatriate baseball players in Mexico
Swing of the Quad Cities players
Palm Beach Cardinals players
Memphis Redbirds players
Springfield Cardinals players
Gulf Coast Cardinals players
Gwinnett Braves players
Colorado Springs Sky Sox players
Pensacola Blue Wahoos players
Lancaster Barnstormers players
Minor league baseball coaches
Minor league baseball managers